The Sir Aga Khan Bridge is a  single-span beam bridge, which officially opened to traffic on 27 February 2017. The bridge was inaugurated by Pakistan Peoples Party (PPP) chairperson Bilawal Bhutto Zardari. This is the longest bridge on the Indus River. Sir Aga Khan Bridge connects Tando Muhammad Khan with Thatta.

References

Bridges in Pakistan
Bridges completed in 2017
Transport in Sindh